The Johan Cruyff Arena (officially stylised as Johan Cruijff ArenA) is the main stadium of the Dutch capital city of Amsterdam and the home stadium of football club AFC Ajax since its opening. Built from 1993 to 1996 at a cost equivalent to €140 million, it is the largest stadium in the country. The stadium was previously known as the Amsterdam Arena (stylised as Amsterdam ArenA) until the 2018–19 football season, when it was officially renamed in honour of legendary Dutch footballer Johan Cruyff (1947–2016) who died in March 2016.

It was one of the stadiums used during UEFA Euro 2000, and also held the 1998 UEFA Champions League Final and 2013 UEFA Europa League Final. The stadium also hosted three group stage matches and one match in the round of 16 of the UEFA Euro 2020.

Both international and Dutch artists have given concerts in the stadium, including Tina Turner, Coldplay, U2, Take That, Celine Dion, Madonna, Michael Jackson, André Hazes, David Bowie, AC/DC, Justin Timberlake, One Direction, The Rolling Stones, Beyoncé, Rihanna, and Armin van Buuren. The dance event Sensation was held in the stadium every year, up until the final edition in 2017.

The stadium has a retractable roof and a grass surface. Since 2022, the stadium has a capacity of 56,130 people during football matches, increased from 54,990. The stadium has a capacity of 68,000 during concerts if a center-stage setup is used (the stage in the middle of the pitch); for end-stage concerts, the capacity is 50,000; and for concerts for which the stage is located in the east side of the stadium, the capacity is 35,000. It held UEFA five-star stadium status, which was superseded by a new system of classification.

History

Amsterdam was one of six cities that bid to host the 1992 Summer Olympics. In 1986, a new Olympic stadium was designed, with a football field and an athletics track. It was to be built in the area of Strandvliet in Amsterdam Zuidoost. After Amsterdam lost the bid to Barcelona in October 1986, the plans for the new stadium were abandoned. In 1987, the Stichting Amsterdam Sportstad (English: "Amsterdam Sports City Foundation") was established, which made new plans for a sports stadium with an all-seated capacity of 55,000. In 1990, a new design was made based on both previous designs, with a football field, an athletics track, and completely covered by a roof. By this time, AFC Ajax needed a new stadium, as their previous home ground, De Meer, was far too small for most of Ajax's games. Since the late 1960s, Ajax had moved its most important games to Olympisch Stadion. Indeed, from the 1920s onward, Ajax had played all of their European fixtures and midweek night games at Olympisch Stadion.

Once more, the design was altered – the athletics track was removed, the capacity was reduced to 50,000 seats, and the fixed roof was replaced by a retractable roof. In 1992, the Government of Amsterdam authorised the plans for the stadium with a Transferium where people could transfer from their car to various forms of public transportation. In 1993, the Government of Amsterdam changed the development plan of the location and gave a permit to build the stadium.

The first pile of the deep foundation of the stadium was placed on 26 November 1993. The construction work, undertaken by Ballast Nedam and Royal BAM Group, took almost three years. The highest point of the building was reached on 24 February 1995, after the roof construction was raised. The fly-over from the public road to the parking facilities was opened on 13 March 1996. The stadium received 180,000 visitors during the construction work, until the stadium was closed from 1 July 1996 until the opening ceremony. The stadium was officially opened on 14 August 1996 by Queen Beatrix.

At the grand opening, the queen made a curtain fall inside the stadium. Two-dimensional ships were placed on the sea representing the clubs in the Eredivisie. Trijntje Oosterhuis sang the hymn "De Zee", composed for the opening ceremony by John Ewbank. An eight-day torch relay with 375 runners over 1400 km through the Netherlands reached the stadium. The first runner was Johan Cruyff starting in the old stadium De Meer, and the last runner was Frank Rijkaard arriving in the new stadium. After the grass was revealed and the roof opened, an inaugural football match was played between AFC Ajax and Milan, which Ajax lost 0–3. Tina Turner opened the stadium with three concerts with 160,000 people, from her world breaking Wildest Dreams Tour.

The construction of the stadium cost an equivalent of €140 million (at the time, the currency of the Netherlands was the Dutch guilder).

The stadium combines a retractable roof with a grass surface. This caused some problems in the beginning: the turf's grass would not grow in the shade of the open roof and had to be replaced up to four times a year.

Exterior renovation

In September 2015, plans were presented to renovate the stadium's facade. The renovation should provide better quality and service to visitors by widening the walkway rings around the stadium, creating more room for the visitors and for new facilities (the number of seats remains the same). As a result, the outside of the stadium transforms from a concave shape to a convex shape, drastically altering its appearance. The renovation was completed in 2020, when four matches of the UEFA Euro 2020 championship were played in the Arena.

Construction works started in June 2017. The first phase is to renovate the east side of the stadium, where construction of the new facade was completed in April 2018.

Name change

On 25 April 2017, it was announced that the Amsterdam Arena would be renamed to "Johan Cruijff Arena" in memory of Ajax legend Johan Cruyff. Later that year, on 9 August, it was stated that the name change would take place on 25 October 2017. However, this was postponed as that date proved to be infeasible due to the many matters that needed to be settled, such as arranging compensation for possible loss of income, transferring part of the shares from the municipality of Amsterdam to Ajax and having a discussion with the Cruyff family.

On 5 April 2018, it was announced that the stadium would officially change name at the start of the 2018–19 football season. The stadium's new logo was revealed on 25 April 2018, the birthday of Johan Cruyff. According to the spokeswoman of Cruyff's family, the original Dutch spelling of his name (Cruijff) was chosen for the stadium's official name "to stay close to the Dutch Johan". The 2018–19 football season started in August 2018.

Building and facilities
The stadium's original architect is the Dutchman Rob Schuurman. The original all-seated capacity was 54,990. After the 2019–20 season, but before Euro 2020, capacity was expanded by 660. The final increased capacity after the 2017-2021 renovation project is 56,120, an increase of 1,130. The original capacity during music concerts – the stadium's maximum capacity – is 68,000 visitors. The parking capacity of the Transferium is 500 cars (inside); there are an additional 12,000 parking spots outside.

The Johan Cruyff Arena is one of two stadiums in the Netherlands that is rated as Category 4 by UEFA, the other being the Feijenoord Stadion in Rotterdam.

The Ajax Museum is located in the stadium, which shows Ajax's more than 120 years of history.

The nearest train and subway (metro) station is Amsterdam Bijlmer Arena. The metro lines 50 and 54 (Amsterdam Central Station and city center) stop here.

Sporting events

Association football

The stadium is the home of AFC Ajax in the Eredivisie and European matches.

The inaugural match on 14 August 1996 was a friendly between the home team Ajax and AC Milan, which ended with a 3–0 win for Milan. The first goal was scored by Dejan Savićević. The first Ajax goal was scored in the first competition match against NAC Breda by Kiki Musampa.

The 1998 UEFA Champions League Final when Real Madrid defeated Juventus by 1–0, was played in the stadium. It was also one of the venues in UEFA Euro 2000.

And the stadium was the host of the 2013 UEFA Europa League Final, when Chelsea defeated Benfica by 2–1.

It hosts often Dutch national team's international matches, though the Netherlands does not have one dedicated national stadium for football.

In addition, the stadium hosts pre-season friendlies or in the past aswel tournaments, like the Amsterdam Tournament or games of Ajax's reserve team.

Euro 2000

Euro 2020
The stadium hosted three group stage matches and one round of 16 match at the UEFA Euro 2020, which was postponed to 2021 due to the COVID-19 pandemic in Europe.

American football
The stadium was home of the American football team Amsterdam Admirals of the NFL Europe, until the National Football League (NFL) ended its European competition in June 2007. The team played over 50 matches in the stadium from 1997 to 2007. World Bowl IX was played at the Arena in 2001, when the Berlin Thunder defeated the Barcelona Dragons.

Kickboxing
As kickboxing is a popular combat sport in the Netherlands, the It's Showtime and K-1 promotions have held a number of fight cards at the arena. Many of the sport's biggest stars such as Peter Aerts, Semmy Schilt, Badr Hari and Ernesto Hoost have fought there.

Music events

Tina Turner was the first to perform at the arena, during her Wildest Dreams Tour, with more than 157,000 people attending the three sold-out concerts on 6–8 September 1996.

Michael Jackson performed at the arena during his HIStory World Tour, showcasing five sold-out concerts, on 28, 30 September; 2 October 1996; again, on 8 & 10 June 1997, totaling an attending audience of 250,000.

The Rolling Stones performed at the stadium ten times; the first five times were on 29 June and 1, 2, 5 and 6 July 1998, during their Bridges to Babylon Tour, in front of a totally sold-out crowd of 261,277 people. The sixth and the seventh shows were on 19 August – 22 September 2003, during their Licks Tour. The eighth was on 31 July 2006 during their A Bigger Bang Tour. The ninth was on 30 September 2017 during their 2017 leg of their No Filter Tour. They performed there a tenth time on the 13 June 2022 as part of their SIXTY Tour.

Backstreet Boys performed at the stadium on 5 June 1999, during their Into the Millennium Tour.

Céline Dion has been a frequent artist at the arena, performing to a sold-out crowd for the first time in 1997, on her Falling into You: Around the World tour.  During her Let's Talk About Love World Tour, she performed to another sold-out crowd of 64,652. Most recently, her Taking Chances World Tour in 2008 saw the singer performing to a crowd of 46,969 people.

Bon Jovi performed at the stadium four times: the first and the second were on 5 and 6 June 2001, during their One Wild Night Tour. The third one was on 3 June 2003, during their Bounce Tour. The fourth one was on 13 June 2008, during their Lost Highway Tour, in front of a sold-out crowd of 34,512 people.

Robbie Williams played at the venue eight times: twice in July 2003 as part of Weekends of Mass Distraction; four dates in June 2006, as part of his Close Encounters Tour; and on 13 July 2013 during the Take The Crown Stadium Tour. He also performed on 18 July 2011, as a member of Take That, during their Progress Live tour.

David Bowie performed a concert in the arena, as part of his A Reality Tour, on 11 June 2004.

Genesis performed at the stadium on 1 July 2007 during their Turn It On Again: The Tour. The performances of "Turn It On Again" and "No Son of Mine" were recorded for the group's live album, Live over Europe 2007.

U2 performed at the stadium seven times: the first, the second and the third were on 13, 15, and 16 July 2005 during their Vertigo Tour, in front of a total sold-out crowd of 165,516 people. The fourth and the fifth were on 20 and 21 July 2009 during their U2 360° Tour, in front of a total sold-out crowd of 125,886 people. The band's sixth and seventh shows were for their The Joshua Tree Tour 2017 on 29 and 30 July 2017.

Madonna has performed at three different dates, with all tickets sold out. There were two performances of the Confessions Tour in 2006, and one presentation of the Sticky & Sweet Tour in 2008.

Dutch music group De Toppers have played annually at the venue since 2005. In total, they have sold out more than 50 concerts; no other act has performed at the stadium that many times.

In October 2008, the stadium was home to Dutch children's group Kinderen voor Kinderen. The Arena was selected because of the seating requirement for the group's new format of concert called the "Mega Spektakel". The group had two concerts in the stadium on the same day, due to high volume of attendees, mostly children.

AC/DC performed a show on 23 June 2009 as part of their Black Ice World Tour.

The stadium is also host to dance event Sensation.

André Rieu and his orchestra (plus about 650 brass instrument players) had a huge concert in 2011.

Muse performed a show on 4 June 2013 as part of their The 2nd Law World Tour.

On 8 September 2013, former Pink Floyd member Roger Waters performed a show of his own called The Wall Live Concert Tour.

On 24 and 25 June 2014, boyband One Direction performed in the arena as part of their Where We Are Tour.

Rihanna performed at the venue as part of her Anti World Tour on 17 June 2016.

Coldplay performed 2 concerts on 23 June 2016 and 24 June 2016 as part of their A Head Full of Dreams Tour. The band is scheduled to come back to the stadium on 15, 16, 18, & 19 July 2023 as part of their Music of the Spheres World Tour.

Beyoncé performed at the venue on 16 July 2016 as a part of her Formation World Tour. The concert sold out within 20 minutes.

Armin van Buuren played the venue twice in May 2017 as part of his the Best of Armin Only world tour in celebration of 20 years in music. He was the First Solo DJ to do so.

Beyonce & Jay-Z performed at the venue on 19 and 20 June 2018 as a part of their On the Run II Tour. A second show was added, due to the first one selling out within an hour.

Bruce Springsteen and the E Street Band are scheduled to perform two concerts on 25 and 27 May 2023 during their 2023 Tour. It will be their second visit to the venue after a concert in 2008 as part of the Magic Tour.

Beyonce will perform at the venue on 17 and 18 June 2023 as part of her Renaissance World Tour.

The Weeknd will perform at the venue on 23 and 24 June 2023 as part of his After Hours til Dawn Tour.

The arena was listed as a potential venue in Amsterdam's bid to host the 65th Eurovision Song Contest. However, the city later withdrew its bid due to venues, including the Johan Cruyff Arena, being fully booked.

See also

Halte Amsterdam ArenA

References

External links

Ajax Museum
aannemer amsterdam

Sports venues in Amsterdam
Football venues in the Netherlands
Retractable-roof stadiums in Europe
UEFA Euro 2000 stadiums in the Netherlands
AFC Ajax facilities
Sports venues completed in 1996
Music venues in the Netherlands
Amsterdam-Zuidoost
UEFA Euro 2020 stadiums
Johan Cruyff
1996 establishments in the Netherlands
20th-century architecture in the Netherlands